Milena Mayorga is a former Salvadoran deputy to the Legislative Assembly of El Salvador for San Salvador department. She is a former model and beauty pageant contestant who represented El Salvador in Miss Universe 1996, where she finished in the top ten. On September 24, 2020, president Nayib Bukele appointed her as Ambassador to the United States.

Biography 
Mayorga was born in San Salvador to a doctor and a Venezuelan mother. After graduating high school, Mayorga became a model for Willie Maldonado in the longest-running TV show in El Salvador, Fin de Semana.

After Miss Universe, Mayorga went on to be a news presenter for Teledos of the Telecorporación Salvadoreña from 1999 to 2005. In June 2005, she joined rival channel Canal 12 and became part of a new group of presenters on El Salvador's longest running morning show, Hola El Salvador. In 2011, Mayorga became conductor of her own talk show, Milena tu amiga on Canal 12.

She is married and has two children.

Political career 

Mayorga serves as congresswoman to the Legislative Assembly of El Salvador for the department of San Salvador in the 2018-2021 legislature, elected as a candidate for the Nationalist Republican Alliance. However, on June 4, 2020, she renounced her party membership, accusing the party's leadership of corruption. She became the Ambassador to The United States on December 1, 2020.

Education 

 Central American Institute of Political Studies INCEP - Central American Integration and Political Science course at Guatemala City on 2017.
 Theological Institute by Extension - International Biblical Seminary Certificate from 2009 to 2012.
 Mónica Herrera School of Communications - Bachelor's degree on Social Communications and Marketing from 1998 to 2000.
 Mónica Herrera School of Communications - Advertising Technician from 1997 to 1998.
 Tulane University - Theology from 1995 to 1997.

Legislative Positions 

As a legislator, in relation to corruption, Mayorga supported the creation of the Permanent Commission against Corruption, the creation of the International Commission against Impunity in El Salvador, and a law for the repatriation of stolen or evaded capital. In regard to foreign relations, she supported the creation of a special commission to monitor the situation of Salvadorans residing in the United States before the termination of Temporary Protected Status, a law for the exercise of the vote from abroad in the 2021 Salvadoran legislative election, reform of the migration and immigration legislation, and ratification of the Treaty on the Prohibition of Nuclear Weapons. In 2020, she voted in favor of all the proposals by the government of Nayib Bukele in terms of loans, fiscal measures, and health measures related to COVID-19.

References 

Living people
Miss Universe 1996 contestants
People from San Salvador
Salvadoran beauty pageant winners
Year of birth missing (living people)